Kevin McCabe may refer to:

Kevin McCabe (businessman) (born 1948), English property businessman
Kevin McCabe (economist), American economist
Kevin McCabe (Gaelic footballer) (born 1960), Northern Irish Gaelic footballer
Kevin McCabe (banjoist), American musician
Kevin McCabe (American football) (born 1984), American football player
Kevin J. McCabe, Alaska state representative